Akranes is a port town and municipality on the west coast of Iceland, around  north of the capital Reykjavík.

The area where Akranes is located was settled in the 9th century; however, it did not receive a municipal charter until 1942.

History
Akranes was settled in the 9th century by the brothers Þormóður and Ketill, sons of Bresi, who came from Ireland. The town started to form in the mid-17th century as a fishing village. In 1942, it was formally chartered, and in the following years it had the biggest surge in population in its history.

Industry has been a big and growing employer: a cement plant has been operated in the town since the 1950s, and an aluminum smelting plant has been in operation near the town since 1998.

Economy
The fishing industry remains the town's most important source of employment. Akranes also acts as a service center for the large rural region surrounding it.

The town is expected to grow in the coming years because of an increase in industrial activity and improvements in transportation to the Reykjavík area. The  Hvalfjörður Tunnel, opened in 1998, is one of the world's longest underwater road tunnels.

Notable people
Akranes was the birthplace of the Atom poet Jón Óskar, the writer Eva Björg Ægisdóttir and footballers Ríkharður Jónsson and Arnór Sigurðsson.

Sport
Akranes has a strong soccer tradition. The local team, Íþróttabandalag Akraness (ÍA), which currently plays in the Úrvalsdeild karla, has for many years been among the best of the Icelandic football league system. Ríkharður Jónsson, who was born in the town, is often considered to be one of Iceland's finest footballers. He both played for and managed ÍA. Former Sheffield Wednesday and Arsenal midfielder Siggi Jónsson was also born in Akranes and had three seasons as a player with ÍA. The town is also home to second division club Knattspyrnufélagið Kári.

Twin towns – sister cities

Akranes is twinned with:

 Bamble, Norway
 Närpes, Finland
 Qaqortoq, Greenland
 Sørvágur, Faroe Islands
 Tønder, Denmark
 Västervik, Sweden

See also
Akranes Museum Centre

Gallery

References

External links

 

 
Populated places established in the 9th century